"What If I Was Nothing" is a power ballad by American metal band All That Remains. The song was released as a single from their sixth album, A War You Cannot Win, on September 4, 2014, and a music video was released to YouTube on October 21, 2013. In the U.S., it peaked at number two on the Mainstream Rock Tracks chart and at number 3 on the Modern Rock Tracks chart.

Track listing

Charts

Certifications

References

2013 singles
2010s ballads
All That Remains (band) songs
2013 songs
Songs written by Rob Graves
Razor & Tie singles
Songs written by Jason Costa
Songs written by Philip Labonte